Sun Valley is a neighborhood in Los Angeles, California in the San Fernando Valley region. The neighborhood is known for its overall youthful population and moderate racial diversity. There are three recreation centers in Sun Valley, one of which is a historic site. The neighborhood has thirteen public schools—including John H. Francis Polytechnic High School and Sun Valley High School—and four private schools.

Population
The 2000 U.S. census counted 75,848 residents in the 9.42-square-mile Sun Valley neighborhood—or 8,048 people per square mile, about an average population density for the city. In 2008, the city estimated that the population had increased to 81,788. In 2000 the median age for residents was 28, considered young for city and county neighborhoods; the percentage of residents aged 10 or younger was among the county's highest.

The neighborhood was considered "moderately diverse" ethnically within Los Angeles, with a high percentage of Latinos. The breakdown was Latinos, 69.4%; whites, 17.9%;  Asians, 8.1%; blacks, 1.9%; and others, 2.7%.  Mexico (54.5%) and El Salvador (11.9%) were the most common places of birth for the 51.9% of the residents who were born abroad—a high percentage for Los Angeles.

The median yearly household income in 2008 dollars was $51,290, considered average for the city but low for the county. The percentages of households that earned $20,000 to $60,000 were high for the county. Renters occupied 46.1% of the housing stock, and house or apartment-owners held 53.9%.

Geography
Sun Valley is bordered on the northeast by Shadow Hills, on the southeast by Burbank, on the south by North Hollywood and Valley Glen, on the west by Panorama City and on the northwest by Pacoima, Hansen Dam and Lake View Terrace.

Situated at the base of the Verdugo Mountains, Sun Valley is prone to flash floods, and one such flood on Sunday, February 20, 2005 at 22:37 (10:37 p.m.

History

The former Tongva/Fernandeño (Native American) village in this area was called Wixánga, which comes from the word wixár (or "thorn" or "prickle" in English) in the Fernandeño dialect of the Tongva language. Hence, Wixánga meant something like "place/canyon of the thorns" in English, in reference to the abundant prickly pear cacti naturally found in the area. This was later reflected in the Spanish name for the area, or Cañada de las Tunas ("canyon of the thorns" in English). Finally, this became La Tuna Canyon, and now Sun Valley.

In 1874, California State Senator Charles Maclay (for whom Maclay Street in San Fernando is named) acquired 56,000 acres (230 km2) of land across the San Fernando Valley. The area extended from Sunland Blvd. all the way west to the Chatsworth Hills. East of Sunland was Rancho San Rafael, a large land grant to José María Verdugo by the Spanish Crown.

By 1876, the Southern Pacific Railroad was constructed through the eastern San Fernando Valley, linking Southern and Northern California. A general store named Roberts Store was used as a post office and water-tank station; later the area's name was changed to Roscoe, reportedly after the name of a railroad crew member. The current name of Sun Valley was chosen in 1950 by residents.

Old Trapper's Lodge

Old Trapper's Lodge, California Historical Landmark No. 939, an outsider art environment that pays homage to the pioneer upbringing of its creator, John Ehn (1897–1981), was situated in Sun Valley. It represented the life work of the self-taught artist who wished to pass on a sense of the Old West, derived from personal experiences, myths, and tall tales. From 1951 to 1981, using his family as models, and incorporating memorabilia, he followed his dreams and visions to create the lodge and its "Boot Hill." The artwork was moved from the original site in Sun Valley, CA, and relocated to Pierce College in Woodland Hills.

Foundation

 The  Theodore Payne Foundation for Wild Flowers and Native Plants  is located in Sun Valley; it is dedicated to helping people discover the beauty of California native plants.

Government and infrastructure

Los Angeles Fire Department Fire Station 77 is located in the Sun Valley area. The station is in the Battalion 12 district.

The United States Postal Service Sun Valley Post Office is located at 10946 Ratner Street.

Sun Valley is part of the City of Los Angeles.

Education

One of every ten of Sun Valley residents aged 25 and older had earned a four-year degree by 2000, a low percentage for both the city and the county. The percentage of the same-age residents with less than a high school diploma was high for the county.

Schools within the Sun Valley boundaries are:

Public

 John H. Francis Polytechnic High School, 12431 Roscoe Boulevard
 Valley Oaks Center for Enriched Studies Magnet, 9171 Telfair Avenue
 Fernangeles Elementary School, 12001 Art Street
 Robert H. Lewis Continuation school, 12508 Wicks Street
 Richard E. Byrd Middle School, 8501 Arleta Avenue
 Arminta Street Elementary School, 11530 Strathern Street
 Strathern Street Elementary School, 7939 St. Clair Avenue
 Saticoy Elementary School, 7850 Ethel Avenue
 Glenwood Elementary School, 8001 Ledge Avenue
 Roscoe Elementary School, 10765 Strathern Street
 Vinedale Elementary School, 10150 La Tuna Canyon Rd
 Charles Leroy Lowman Special Education Center, 12827 Saticoy Street
 Camelia Avenue Elementary School, 7451 Camelia Avenue
 Sun Valley Magnet School, 7330 Bakman Avenue
 Alliance Marine Innovation 6-12 Complex, 11933 Allegheny St
 East Valley Skill Center (Adult School), 8601 Arleta Avenue 
 Fenton Leadership Academy, 8926 Sunland Boulevard, Sun Valley, California 91352 (K-2)
 Fenton STEM Academy, 8926 Sunland Boulevard, Sun Valley, California 91352 (3-5)

Private
Village Christian School, 8930 Village Ave, Sun Valley, CA 91352
 The Master's Seminary, 13248 Roscoe Blvd.
 St. Augustine Academy, 9000 Sunland Boulevard
 Grace Community, 13248 Roscoe Boulevard
 Messiah Lutheran School, elementary, 12020 Cantara Street
 Our Lady of the Holy Rosary, elementary, 7802 Vineland Avenue

Public libraries
The Los Angeles Public Library operates the Sun Valley Branch.

Parks and recreation
 The Sun Valley Recreation Center in Sun Valley includes a public swimming pool, lighted baseball diamond, lighted outdoor basketball courts, a children's play area, a football field, picnic tables, a lighted soccer field, lighted tennis courts, and a lighted volleyball court.
 The Fernangeles Recreation Center in Sun Valley includes a public swimming pool, an auditorium, barbecue pits, a lighted baseball diamond, lighted indoor basketball courts, lighted outdoor basketball courts, a children's play area, a lighted football field, an indoor gymnasium with weights, picnic tables, and a lighted soccer field.
 The Stonehurst Recreation Center in Sun Valley is a historic site. The center has an indoor gymnasium and auditorium with a capacity of 400 people, barbecue pits, a lighted baseball diamond, lighted outdoor basketball courts, a children's play area, a community room, a lighted football field, an indoor gymnasium with weights, picnic tables, a lighted soccer field, and volleyball courts.

Notable people
Skylar Deleon, former actor and convicted murderer
John F. MacArthur, American pastor and author
Amber Rayne, American pornographic actor

References

External links

 Sun Valley Area Neighborhood Council
 The Theodore Payne Foundation for Wild Flowers and Native Plants—in Sun Valley
 Sun Valley Hills—a community website for CERT, emergency and other information
 Sun Valley crime map and statistics

 
Communities in the San Fernando Valley
Neighborhoods in Los Angeles